Fortnum may refer to:

 Fortnum & Mason, English department store.
 William Fortnum, its founder.
 Charles Drury Edward Fortnum (1820-99), a later member of the same family, art collector, historian, and benefactor of the University of Oxford.
 Peggy Fortnum (1919–2016), English writer and illustrator, notably of Paddington Bear.